is a professional Japanese baseball player. He plays catcher for the Fukuoka SoftBank Hawks.

External links

 NPB.com

1985 births
Living people
Baseball people from Kanagawa Prefecture
Japanese baseball players
Nippon Professional Baseball catchers
Yomiuri Giants players
Hokkaido Nippon-Ham Fighters players
Fukuoka SoftBank Hawks players
Japanese baseball coaches
Nippon Professional Baseball coaches